The Lemuel H. Redd Jr. House is a historic house in Bluff, Utah. It was built in 1900 for Lemuel H. Redd Jr., a Mormon settler, landowner and politician who served as a member of the Utah State Legislature from 1898 to 1902.

Redd also served as the local bishop from 1901 to 1910, and as the president of the San Juan stake from 1910 to 1923. He had two wives: Elilza Ann Westover, with whom he had eight children, and  Lucy Zina Lyman, with whom he had four children. He lived in this house, designed in the Late Victorian style, with his first family while his second family lived first in a house across the street, and later in Blanding, Utah. The house has been listed on the National Register of Historic Places since May 18, 1983.

References

External links

		
National Register of Historic Places in San Juan County, Utah
Victorian architecture in Utah
Houses completed in 1900
1900 establishments in Utah